Lakeside is a rural community located in Kings County, New Brunswick, Canada. It is located near the communities of Nauwigewauk and Hampton.

History

Notable people

See also
List of communities in New Brunswick

Communities in Kings County, New Brunswick